Makhdoom Zada Syed Ali Hassan Gillani (born 16 September 1974) is a Pakistani politician who had been a member of the National Assembly of Pakistan, from June 2013 to May 2018.

Early life
He was born on 16 September 1974.

Political career

He was elected to the National Assembly as a candidate of Pakistan Muslim League (Q) (PML-Q) from Constituency NA-183 (Bahawalpur-I) in 2002 Pakistani general election. He received 51,435 votes and defeated an independent candidate, Syed Sohail Hasan Gillani.

He was disqualified to run for the seat of the National Assembly in 2008 Pakistani general election for being defaulter of the Tehsil Municipal Administration.

He was re-elected to the National Assembly as a candidate of Pakistan Muslim League (N) (PML-N) from Constituency NA-183 (Bahawalpur-I) in 2013 Pakistani general election. He received 61,891 votes and defeated Makhdoom Syed Sami Ul Hassan, a candidate of Bahawalpur National Awami Party. He joined Pakistan Peoples Party and lost election 2018 by obtaining 51359 votes against Makhdoom Syed Sami Ul Hassan Gillani.

References

Living people
Pakistan Muslim League (N) politicians
Punjabi people
Pakistani MNAs 2013–2018
1974 births